Jesse Duplantis (born July 9, 1949) is an American preacher from the Christian Evangelical Charismatic movement.  He is based in New Orleans, Louisiana, U.S., and the founder of Jesse Duplantis Ministries.

Evangelical career
Duplantis is considered a preacher of the prosperity gospel.

Duplantis was on the Board of Regents of Oral Roberts University, which awarded him an honorary doctorate, until late 2007, when he, fellow regent Creflo Dollar, and the President of the University Richard Roberts all resigned. Duplantis said in a prepared statement released by the school, "the demands of ministry have made it increasingly difficult to continue to effectively serve." The rest of the Board which included Kenneth Copeland and Benny Hinn was swept away over the next few weeks after the University accepted a $70 million donation on the condition it inaugurate "a new era of transparent governance and accountability."

Awards
In recognition of his "many years of effectively sharing God's message of salvation through Jesus Christ to the world," Jesse Duplantis was awarded an honorary Doctorate of Divinity degree from Oral Roberts University in 1999.

Private jet 
In May 2018, national news media outlets reported that Duplantis had asked his followers to donate money to him so that he could buy a Dassault Falcon 7X, valued at $54 million. Duplantis said that his organization, Jesse Duplantis Ministries, had already paid for three private jets by 2006, and that he had been using them by "just burning them up for the Lord Jesus Christ." Duplantis defended his choice by saying: "I really believe that if Jesus was physically on the earth today he wouldn't be riding a donkey. Think about that for a minute. He'd be in an airplane preaching the gospel all over the world." In response to a wave of criticism, Duplantis stated on his ministry website, "I'm not asking you to pay for my plane, I'm asking you to pray for my plane." 

In 2016, Duplantis and fellow televangelist Kenneth Copeland defended their use of private jets with the claim that commercial planes were full of "demons".

Other issues

The Trinity Foundation (Dallas), a religious watchdog organization, has kept an eye on Duplantis for more than 10 years. The organization's president Ole Anthony said that because of Duplantis' tax exemption, technically, every person in St. Charles Parish was “helping to pay for Duplantis' extravagant lifestyle”.

In the aftermath of 2021's Hurricane Ida, Duplantis has faced criticism for his ministry's perceived lack of response to helping the community. His church resides in St. Charles Parish, where some 95 percent of the residences remained without power for weeks after the storm. St. Charles Parish was one of the hardest hit areas.

Published works

Books

References

External links
Jesse Duplantis Ministries Online (Official website)
TV.com bio
IMDb Mini Bio

1948 births
American Christian writers
American Pentecostal pastors
American television evangelists
Christians from Louisiana
Former Roman Catholics
Living people
Oral Roberts University people
Pentecostal writers
People from Destrehan, Louisiana
Writers from New Orleans
Converts to Pentecostal denominations
Prosperity theologians
American Christian Zionists